The following events occurred in November 1993. For a more complete listing of notable deaths this month, see Deaths in November 1993.

Monday, November 1, 1993
 The Maastricht Treaty takes effect, formally establishing the European Union.
 The British Women's Royal Naval Service is absorbed into the Royal Navy.
 The trial begins of the two alleged killers in the February 12 abduction and murder of James Bulger, a two-year-old British boy.

 STS-58: Space Shuttle Columbia lands at Edwards Air Force Base, California, at 7:05 a.m. PST, completing the STS-58 mission.
 Born:
 Saleh Al-Shehri, Saudi Arabian footballer; in Jeddah, Saudi Arabia
 Chizuru Arai, Japanese Olympic champion judoka; in Yorii, Saitama, Japan
 Marko Bakić, Montenegrin footballer; in Budva, Federal Republic of Yugoslavia
 Antonio Correia, Cape Verdean footballer; in Santiago, Cape Verde
 Krystyna Freda, American-born Cypriot footballer
 Marvin Gakpa, French footballer; in Dunkirk, France
 Afa Ismail, Maldivian Olympic sprinter; in Malé, Maldives
 Sean Kelly, Scottish footballer; in Glasgow, Scotland
 Pat O'Connor, National Football League defensive end; in Evergreen Park, Illinois
 Richard Ofori, Ghanaian footballer
 Laura Pugh, Australian rules footballer
 Maxime Rizzo, French alpine skier; in Bourg-Saint-Maurice, Savoie, France
 Iván Rossi, Argentine footballer; in Castelar, Buenos Aires Province, Argentina
 Daniel Wilson, Guyana footballer; in Georgetown, Guyana
 Died: Severo Ochoa, 88, Spanish physician and biochemist, recipient of the Nobel Prize in Physiology or Medicine

Tuesday, November 2, 1993
 The Troubles in Newry: 30-year-old Protestant Brian Woods, a member of the Royal Ulster Constabulary, dies two days after being shot by an Irish Republican Army sniper at a vehicle checkpoint in Newry, County Down.
 In the 1993 New York City mayoral election, Republican Rudy Giuliani defeats incumbent Democrat David Dinkins for the position of Mayor of New York City.
 1993 United States gubernatorial elections: Two U.S. states vote to elect governors. In the 1993 New Jersey gubernatorial election, Republican Christine Todd Whitman defeats incumbent Democrat James Florio for the position of Governor of New Jersey. In the 1993 Virginia gubernatorial election, Republican U.S. Representative George Allen defeats Democrat Mary Sue Terry, the former Attorney General of Virginia, for the position of Governor.
 Born:
 Katsyaryna Andreeva, Belarusian journalist; in Minsk, Belarus
 Tobias Borg, Swedish professional basketball player; in Södertälje, Sweden
 Ignacio Caroca, Chilean footballer; in Curicó, Chile
 Harvey Dixon, Gibraltarian middle-distance runner; in Nice, France
 Marianne Fortier, Canadian actress; in Val-Bélair, Quebec, Canada
 Edoardo Goldaniga, Italian footballer; in Milan, Italy
 Ryan Ingraham, Bahamian high jumper
 Dimitrios Kourbelis, Greek footballer; in Korakovouni, Arcadia, Greece
 Dražen Luburić, Serbian volleyball player; in Novi Sad, Republic of Serbia, Federal Republic of Yugoslavia
 Nico Müller, German Olympic weightlifter; in Mosbach, Baden-Württemberg, Germany
 Víctor Ruiz, Spanish footballer; in Valencia, Spain

Wednesday, November 3, 1993
 In Chicago, Illinois, the partial collapse of a post office building under construction kills two construction workers and injures five.
 Born:
 Ezgi Dağdelenler, Turkish volleyball player; in Ankara, Turkey
 Rodrigo Ely, Brazilian footballer; in Lajeado, Rio Grande do Sul, Brazil
 Kenny Golladay, National Football League wide receiver; in Chicago, Illinois
 Josh Griffiths, Welsh marathon runner
 Kaleena Mosqueda-Lewis (born Kaleena Jordan Lewis), American professional basketball player; in Pomona, California
 George Odum, National Football League safety; in Millington, Tennessee
 Martina Trevisan, Italian tennis player; in Florence, Italy
 Died: Leon Theremin (born Lev Sergeyevich Termen), 97, Russian and Soviet inventor of the theremin

Thursday, November 4, 1993

 China Airlines Flight 605, a brand-new 747-400, overruns the runway at Kai Tak Airport in Hong Kong; there are no fatalities.
 Jean Chrétien becomes the 20th Prime Minister of Canada.
 The National Basketball Association awards its 28th franchise to Toronto. The new team will be named the Toronto Raptors in May 1994.
 Born:
 Moira Dela Torre, Filipina singer-songwriter; in Olongapo, Philippines
 Michael Gogl, Austrian cyclist; in Gmunden, Upper Austria, Austria
 Julien Laporte, French footballer; in Clermont-Ferrand, France
 Luo Jing, Chinese footballer; in Guiyang, Guizhou, China
 Obinna Oleka, American professional basketball player; in Washington, D.C.
 Andrus Peat, National Football League guard; in Mesa, Arizona
 Alejandro Peñaranda, Colombian footballer; in Jamundí, Colombia (d. 2018, shot)
 Elisabeth Seitz, German Olympic artistic gymnast; in Heidelberg, Baden-Württemberg, Germany
 Jordan Smith, American singer and songwriter; in Whitley County, Kentucky
 Drew Starkey, American actor; in Hickory, North Carolina

Friday, November 5, 1993
 The Parliament of the United Kingdom passes the Railways Act 1993, setting out the procedures for privatisation of British Rail.
 Born:
 Ignacio González (born Juan Ignacio González Brazeiro), Uruguayan footballer; in Paysandú, Uruguay
 Jesús Jiménez, Spanish footballer; in Leganés, Spain
 Shy Martin (born Sara Hjellström), Swedish singer and songwriter; in Lerdala, Sweden
 Leila Mimmack, English actress; in Leamington Spa, Warwickshire, England
 Mbagnick Ndiaye, Senegalese Olympic judoka
 Stoichkov (born Juan Diego Molina Martínez), Spanish footballer; in Los Barrios, Spain
 Hideya Tawada, Japanese actor and model; in Osaka Prefecture, Japan

Saturday, November 6, 1993
 The 1993 New Zealand general election is held.
 The Riddick Bowe vs. Evander Holyfield II boxing match is held at Caesars Palace in Paradise, Nevada. Holyfield wins by majority decision. During Round 7 of the fight, parachutist James Miller crashes his paraglider into the side of the ring; he is knocked unconscious by fans and security and taken to a local hospital.
 Born:
 Rebeka Abramovič, Slovenian basketball player; in Ljubljana, Slovenia
 Toni Datković, Croatian footballer; in Zagreb, Croatia
 Thalita de Jong, Dutch cyclist; in Bergen op Zoom, North Brabant, Netherlands
 Carina Doyle, Australian-born New Zealand Olympic swimmer; in Darwin, Northern Territory, Australia
 Dearica Hamby, American professional basketball player
 Ryuji Izumi, Japanese footballer; in Yokkaichi, Mie Prefecture, Japan
 Ante Majstorović, Croatian footballer; in Zagreb, Croatia
 Fausto Masnada, Italian cyclist; in Bergamo, Italy
 Emmanuel Ogbah, Nigerian-American National Football League defensive end; in Lagos, Nigeria
 Héctor Sáez, Spanish cyclist; in Caudete, Castilla–La Mancha, Spain
 Joe Schobert, National Football League linebacker; in Waukesha, Wisconsin
 Dominik Starkl, Austrian footballer; in Sankt Pölten, Austria
 Isaac Viñales, Spanish motorcycle racer; in Llançà, Spain
 Josh Wakefield, English footballer; in Frimley, Surrey, England
 Erdoğan Yeşilyurt, Turkish-German footballer; in Euskirchen, Germany

Sunday, November 7, 1993

 Ayrton Senna wins the 1993 Australian Grand Prix at Adelaide Street Circuit. This will prove to be the last race Senna finishes before his death on May 1, 1994. It is also Alain Prost's final Formula One Grand Prix before his retirement; Senna embraces his longtime rival on the award podium.
 Born:
 Charity Adule, Nigerian footballer; in Warri, Delta State, Nigeria
 Claudiu Belu, Romanian footballer; in Timișoara, Romania
 Dóra Bodonyi, Hungarian Olympic champion sprint canoeist; in Szarvas, Hungary
 Jürgen Locadia, Dutch footballer; in Emmen, Netherlands
 Arthur Masuaku (born Fuka-Arthur Masuaku Kawela), French footballer; in Lille, France
 Ronen Rubinstein, Israeli-American actor, writer, director and singer; in Rehovot, Israel
 Tan Ya-ting, Taiwanese Olympic archer; in Hsinchu, Taiwan
 Stefano Tonut, Italian professional basketball player; in Cantù, Italy
 Died:
 Adelaide Hall, 92, American jazz singer and entertainer, old age
 Terris Moore, 85, American explorer and mountaineer, president of the University of Alaska, heart attack

Monday, November 8, 1993
 In the early morning hours, burglars lower themselves through the roof of the Moderna Museet in Stockholm, Sweden, to commit a $52 million robbery, stealing five paintings and a sculpture by Pablo Picasso and two paintings by Georges Braque. After negotiating with the thieves for a year, the museum will recover all of the Picasso paintings and one of the Braque paintings.
 Born:
 Cody Arens, American actor; in Richmond, Vermont
 Bence Batik, Hungarian footballer; in Szeged, Hungary
 Felipe Campos, Chilean footballer; in Santiago, Chile
 Kevin Giovesi, Italian racing driver; in Rho, Lombardy, Italy
 Maryna Ivashchanka, Belarusian basketball player; in Rechytsa, Belarus
 Sinead Jack, Trinidad and Tobago volleyball player; in Mount Hope, Trinidad and Tobago
 Livio Jean-Charles, French professional basketball player; in Cayenne, French Guiana, France
 Przemek Karnowski, Polish professional basketball player; in Bydgoszcz, Poland
 Fraser Mullen, Scottish footballer; in Glasgow, Scotland
 Emil Nielsen, Danish footballer; in Store Merløse, Denmark
 Santeri Paloniemi, Finnish Olympic alpine skier; in Kuusamo, Finland
 Song Ui-young, South Korean-born Singaporean footballer; in Incheon, South Korea
 Lauren Young, Filipino-American actress; in Alexandria, Virginia

Tuesday, November 9, 1993
 The Special Tactics and Rescue Unit of the Singapore Police Force is commissioned.
 Bosnian War: Bosnian Croat forces destroy the Stari Most, or Old Bridge of Mostar, Bosnia and Herzegovina, by tank fire.
 Born:
 Semi Ajayi (born Oluwasemilogo Adesewo Ibidapo Ajayi), English footballer; in Crayford, England
 Halil Akbunar, Turkish footballer; in Konak, İzmir, Turkey
 Ultan Dillane, Irish rugby union player; in Paris, France
 Pete Dunne (born Peter Thomas England), English professional wrestler and promoter; in Birmingham, England
 Satyawart Kadian, Indian wrestler; in Rohtak, Haryana, India
 Bantu Mzwakali, South African footballer; in Cape Town, South Africa
 Reol, Japanese singer, songwriter and rapper; in Nagano Prefecture, Japan
 Died: Stanley Myers, 63, British film composer, cancer

Wednesday, November 10, 1993
 The Parliament of Singapore passes the Fire Safety Act to ensure safety of buildings in the event of fires.
 A bus carrying tourists to Canterbury Cathedral crashes on the M2 motorway in Kent, England, killing the driver and 9 passengers and injuring more than 30.
 Seven climbers and three guides are lost in an avalanche on Chimborazo in Ecuador.
 Born:
 Simon Adjei, Swedish footballer
 Mamadama Bangoura, Guinean Olympic judoka
 Céline Boutier, French professional golfer; in Clamart, France
 Daieishō Hayato (born Hayato Takanishi), Japanese sumo wrestler; in Asaka, Saitama, Japan
 Jobby Justin, Indian footballer; in Thiruvananthapuram, Kerala, India
 Rogen Ladon, Filipino Olympic boxer; in Bago, Negros Occidental, Philippines
 Ben Malango, Congolese footballer; in Kinshasa, Zaire
 Srđan Mijailović, Serbian footballer; in Požega, Republic of Serbia, Federal Republic of Yugoslavia
 Matej Mitrović, Croatian footballer; in Požega, Croatia
 Ibrahim Moro, Ghanaian footballer; in Accra, Ghana
 Maodo Nguirane, Senegalese basketball player; in Yeumbeul, Senegal
 Azusa Tadokoro, Japanese voice actress and singer; in Mito, Ibaraki, Japan
 Died: Alberto Breccia, 74, Argentine comics artist and writer

Thursday, November 11, 1993
 Cape Melville incident: In Queensland, Australia, a group of people illicitly enter Cape Melville National Park, parking their Toyota Land Cruiser near a stand of foxtail palms, the seeds of which are a valuable commodity at this time. One of the intruders, Paul Barbagallo, is the brother of David Barbagallo, the Principal Private Secretary to Wayne Goss, the Premier of Queensland. Department of Environment and Heritage ranger Pat Shears, suspecting the vehicle's occupants to be smugglers, drives their vehicle to the ranger station at Rinyirru National Park and informs his superior, Peter Stanton. These events will lead to a political scandal known as the "Cape Melville affair".

 The Vietnam Women's Memorial, a sculpture honoring women who served in the Vietnam War, is dedicated at the Vietnam Veterans Memorial in Washington, D.C.
 American actress Teri Garr marries John O'Neil; their adopted daughter, Molly O'Neil, is born on the same day. Garr and O'Neil will divorce in 1996.
 Born:
 Juan Acosta, Uruguayan footballer; in Rocha, Uruguay
 Simonas Bilis, Lithuanian Olympic swimmer; in Panevėžys, Lithuania
 Christian Fassnacht, Swiss footballer; in Zürich, Switzerland
 Giovanni Hiwat, Dutch-Surinamese footballer; in Zwolle, Netherlands
 Jamaal Lascelles, English footballer; in Derby, England
 Juan Leiva, Chilean footballer; in Chillán, Chile
 Federico Morlacchi, Italian Paralympic champion swimmer; in Luino, Italy
 Connor Pain, Australian footballer; in Sha Tin, Hong Kong
 Matan Peleg, Guatemalan-Israeli footballer
 Vicky Piria (born Vittoria Piria), Italian-British racing driver; in Milan, Italy
 Aleksandar Radovanović, Serbian footballer; in Šabac, Republic of Serbia, Federal Republic of Yugoslavia
 David Vrankovic, Australian-Serbian footballer; in Sydney

Friday, November 12, 1993
 London Convention on the Prevention of Marine Pollution by Dumping of Wastes and Other Matter: Marine dumping of radioactive waste is outlawed.
 Born:
 Musab Al-Battat, Palestinian footballer; in Dhahiriya, Palestine
 Mackensie Alexander, National Football League cornerback; in Immokalee, Florida
 Lovro Bizjak, Slovenian footballer; in Šmartno ob Paki, Slovenia
 Adán Gurdiel, Spanish footballer; in Fabero, Spain
 Limbikani Mzava, Malawian footballer; in Blantyre, Malawi
 Kurtis Rowe, New Zealand rugby league player; in Taranaki, New Zealand
 Monday Samuel (born Samuel Monday Ayinoko Abu), Nigerian-Swedish footballer; in Nigeria
 James Wilby, British Olympic swimmer; in Glasgow, Glasgow City Region, Scotland
 Tim Williams, National Football League defensive end; in Baton Rouge, Louisiana
 Died:
 Bill Dickey, 86, American baseball player
 H. R. Haldeman, 67, American political aide and businessman, abdominal cancer
 Vincenzo Li Causi, 40, Italian soldier and secret agent, killed during United Nations Operation in Somalia II
 Anna Sten, 84, Ukrainian-born American actress

Saturday, November 13, 1993
 Cape Melville incident: The day after arriving in Cooktown, Queensland, ostensibly in order to visit a cattle station in advance of a visit by Wayne Goss, David Barbagallo and Dennis Atkins, Goss' chief media adviser, accompany Paul Barbagallo and another of the Cape Melville trespassers, Gordon Uechtritz, to a meeting at the Cooktown police station with a police sergeant and Pat Shears. Shears, who will later claim that Atkins and David Barbagallo "grilled" him at the meeting about his actions on November 11, will be fired two weeks later by the Department of Environment and Heritage.
 China Northern Airlines Flight 6901, a McDonnell Douglas MD-82, crashes on approach to Ürümqi Diwopu International Airport in Xinjiang, China, killing four crewmembers and eight passengers.
 In a regular season college football game between two undefeated teams at Notre Dame Stadium in Indiana, the Notre Dame Fighting Irish defeat the Florida State Seminoles by a score of 31–24. The game is among those named as "Games of the Century".

A partial solar eclipse is visible on November 13 and 14 in parts of Australia and South America.
 Born:
 Roger Assalé, Ivorian footballer; in Abengourou, Ivory Coast
 Maria dela Cruz, Filipino-American footballer; in Cagayan de Oro, Philippines
 Lautaro Gianetti, Argentine footballer; in San Nicolás, Buenos Aires, Argentina
 Javontae Hawkins, American professional basketball player; in Flint, Michigan
 Julia Michaels (born Julia Carin Cavazos), American singer and songwriter; in Davenport, Iowa
 Georgios Pamlidis, Greek footballer; in Katerini, Greece
 Giuseppe Prestia, Italian footballer; in Palermo, Italy
 Nicolas Šumský, Czech footballer; in Hradec Králové, Czech Republic
 Maud Welzen, Dutch model; in Beek, Netherlands

Sunday, November 14, 1993
 In a status referendum, residents of Puerto Rico vote by a slim margin to maintain Commonwealth status.
 Andrés Espinosa and Uta Pippig win the men's and women's races of the 1993 New York City Marathon.
 At the Alamodome in San Antonio, Texas, 49-year-old stuntman Randy Hill is killed in front of 16,000 people when "Skycrash", a stunt involving a mid-air collision between two automobiles, goes wrong.
 Born:
 Tabata Amaral, Brazilian political scientist, education activist and politician; in São Paulo, Brazil
 Marwan Elkamash, Egyptian Olympic swimmer
 Luis Gil, American soccer player; in Garden Grove, California
 Eddy Gnahoré, French footballer; in Villeneuve-la-Garenne, Hauts-de-Seine, France
 Guo Ailun, Chinese professional and Olympic basketball player; in Anshan, Liaoning, China
 Mats Haakenstad, Norwegian footballer; in Horten, Norway
 Jackson Hemopo, New Zealand rugby union player; in Whanganui, New Zealand
 Hymel Hunt, Samoa international rugby league player; in Auckland, Auckland Region, New Zealand
 Francisco Lindor, Puerto Rican Major League Baseball shortstop; in Caguas, Puerto Rico
 Shūhei Nomura, Japanese actor; in Kobe, Hyōgo Prefecture, Japan
 Chris Obekpa, Nigerian professional basketball player; in Makurdi, Nigeria
 Janieve Russell, Jamaican Olympic track and field athlete; in Manchester Parish, Jamaica
 Faïz Selemani, French-Comorian footballer; in Marseille, France (some sources give birthdate as November 17, 1993)
 Mery Spolsky (born Maria Ewa Żak), Polish singer, songwriter and fashion designer; in Warsaw, Poland
 Samuel Umtiti (born Samuel Yves Um Titi), Cameroonian-French footballer; in Yaoundé, Cameroon
 Mudo Valdez (born Diego Gabriel Váldez Samudio), Paraguayan footballer; in Asunción, Paraguay
 Leo Vendrame, Japanese professional and Olympic basketball player; in Chikushino, Fukuoka, Japan
 Young Chop (born Tyree Lamar Pittman), American record producer, rapper and songwriter; in Chicago, Illinois
 Died: Sanzō Nosaka, 101, Japanese Communist politician, old age

Monday, November 15, 1993
 In Arizona, a collision between a tractor-trailer and an inmate transfer bus kills the truck driver and Correctional Officer Robert K. Barchey of the Arizona Department of Corrections, who is transporting a prisoner on the bus. All 22 prisoners on the bus are injured, and the bus driver, also a correctional officer, sustains severe injuries that necessitate the amputation of a leg.
 Born:
 Arik Armstead, National Football League defensive end; in Sacramento, California
 Abhishek Das, Indian footballer; in Calcutta, West Bengal, India
 Paulo Dybala, Argentine footballer; in Laguna Larga, Córdoba Province, Argentina
 Allan Fa'alava'au, New Zealand professional and Olympic rugby union player; in Auckland, New Zealand
 Saaya Irie, Japanese actress, gravure idol and singer (Sweet Kiss); in Kitakyushu, Fukuoka Prefecture, Japan
 Mory Konaté, Guinean footballer; in Conakry, Guinea
 Zvonimir Kožulj, Bosnian footballer; in Ljubuški, Bosnia and Herzegovina
 Valentina Margaglio, Italian Olympic skeleton racer; in Casale Monferrato, Province of Alessandria, Italy
 Malkolm Moënza, Swedish footballer; in Gothenburg, Sweden
 Patrik Poór, Hungarian footballer; in Győr, Hungary
 Sidney Rivera, Puerto Rican footballer; in Staten Island, New York City
 Connor Ruane, English footballer; in Manchester, England
 Melitina Staniouta, Belarusian Olympic individual rhythmic gymnast; in Minsk, Belarus
 Marco Susio, Italian rugby union player; in Gavardo, Province of Brescia, Italy
 Died: Luciano Leggio, 68, Italian mobster, heart attack

Tuesday, November 16, 1993
Ashpole falls while crossing the bar in the opposite direction, but survives because he is wearing a parachute.

 U.S. President Bill Clinton signs the Religious Freedom Restoration Act. The U.S. Supreme Court will later find it to be unconstitutional as applied to the states.
 Born:
 Josh Adams, American professional basketball player; in Phoenix, Arizona
 Bahrudin Atajić, Bosnian-Swedish footballer; in Västervik, Sweden
 C. J. Beathard, National Football League quarterback; in Franklin, Tennessee
 Gerry Blakes, American professional basketball player; in Inglewood, California
 Pete Davidson, American comedian and actor; in Staten Island, New York City
 Haris Duljević, Bosnian footballer; in Sarajevo, Bosnia and Herzegovina
 Dakota Earnest, American gymnast; in Lubbock, Texas
 Anthony Forde, Irish footballer; in Ballingarry, County Limerick, Ireland
 David Juncà, Spanish footballer; in Riumors, Spain
 Vaidas Kariniauskas, Lithuanian professional and Olympic basketball player; in Alytus, Lithuania
 Stefan Küng, Swiss-Liechtensteiner cyclist; in Wil, Canton of St. Gallen, Switzerland
 Anrich Nortje, South African cricketer; in Uitenhage, Cape Province, South Africa
 Valentin Onfroy, French Olympic rower; in Verdun, Meuse, France
 Alexey Rybalkin, Russian cyclist; in Taganrog, Russia
 Nélson Semedo, Portuguese footballer; in Lisbon, Portugal
 Ousseynou Thioune, Senegalese footballer; in Kolda, Senegal
 Denzel Valentine, American professional basketball player; in Lansing, Michigan
 Died:
 Lucia Popp (born Lucia Poppová), 54, Slovak soprano, brain cancer
 Evelyn Venable, 80, American actress, cancer

Wednesday, November 17, 1993
 Final night of the 1994 FIFA World Cup qualification process:
 Portugal are eliminated in a match against Italy in Milan.
 Davide Gualtieri scores for San Marino 8.3 seconds into a match against England in Bologna, the fastest goal in World Cup competition up to that time. England win the match by a score of 7–1, but still fail to qualify for the World Cup for the first time since the 1970s.
 Republic of Ireland qualify with a 1–1 draw in an emotionally fraught match with Northern Ireland in Belfast, still in the grip of the Troubles.
 Wales are eliminated in a heartbreaking 2–1 loss to Romania at Cardiff Arms Park, their first loss there since 1910. At the end of the match spectator John Hill, a retired postal carrier, is struck in the neck and killed by a flare. The BBC switch their coverage from the England match to the Wales match partway through, prompting numerous telephone calls of complaint. For the first time since 1938, no British side qualifies for the World Cup.
 France are eliminated in a 2–1 home loss to Bulgaria. Bulgaria's Emil Kostadinov scores the winning goal after France's David Ginola attempts to score rather than keeping the ball under control; this sparks a decades-long feud between Ginola and France manager Gérard Houllier, whom Ginola had previously accused of giving other players preferential treatment. Houllier says after the match, "He [Ginola] sent an Exocet missile through the heart of the team."
 Argentina qualify for the World Cup in the second leg of the OFC–CONMEBOL play-off, played against Australia at Estadio Monumental Antonio Vespucio Liberti in Buenos Aires.
 In Nigeria, General Sani Abacha ousts the government of Ernest Shonekan in a military coup.

 Between November 17 and November 22, the North American Free Trade Agreement (NAFTA) passes the legislative houses in the United States, Canada and Mexico.
 The first meeting of the Asia-Pacific Economic Cooperation summit opens in Seattle, Washington.
 Born:
 Yohan Boli, French-born Ivorian footballer; in Arras, France
 Ryan Edwards, Australian footballer; in Singapore
 Chris Feauai-Sautia, New Zealand rugby union player; in Auckland, New Zealand
 Taylor Gold, American Olympic half-pipe snowboarder; in Steamboat Springs, Colorado
 Filip Mitrović, Montenegrin footballer; in Podgorica, Federal Republic of Yugoslavia
 Gomo Onduku, Nigerian footballer; in Ekeremor, Nigeria
 CJ Perez (born Christian Jaymar Perez), Filipino professional basketball player; in Kowloon, Hong Kong
 Dyshawn Pierre, Canadian professional basketball player; in Whitby, Ontario
 Byron Pringle, National Football League wide receiver; in Tampa, Florida

Thursday, November 18, 1993
 Shortly after midnight, a minibus carrying students home to Worcestershire, England, from a school trip to London crashes into the rear of a maintenance lorry on the M40 motorway, killing 12 children and their teacher. The BBC stir controversy by placing the story as the third item on that evening's Nine O'Clock News, with a report on the Queen's Speech to Parliament running first.
 The Grand Prix Museum is inaugurated in Sé, Macau, prior to the 40th Macau Grand Prix.
 Members of the Association of Professional Flight Attendants begin a planned 11-day strike against American Airlines, disrupting air travel in the week before Thanksgiving. The strike will end on November 22 after U.S. President Clinton helps negotiate an agreement by the parties to submit to binding arbitration.
 Born:
 Andreea Aanei, Romanian Olympic weightlifter; in Botoșani, Romania
 Kyle Adnam, Australian professional basketball player; in Melbourne, Australia
 Gerald Beverly, American professional basketball player; in Rochester, New York
 Cody Hollister, National Football League wide receiver; in Bend, Oregon
 Jacob Hollister, National Football League tight end, twin brother of Cody Hollister; in Bend, Oregon
 Luuk Koopmans, Dutch footballer; in Oss, North Brabant, Netherlands
 Cory Littleton, National Football League linebacker; in Spring Valley, San Diego County, California
 Emma Nilsson, Swedish biathlete; in Grasmark, Sweden
 Maximiliane Rall, German footballer; in Rottweil, Germany
 Taiberson (born Taiberson Ruan Menezes Nunes), Brazilian footballer; in Alegrete, Brazil
 Gianna Woodruff, Panamanian Olympic track and field athlete; in Santa Monica, California
 Died: Fritz Feld, 93, German actor

Friday, November 19, 1993
 A toy factory fire in Shenzhen, China, kills 87 workers and injures 47.
 In the 1993 Curaçao status referendum, voters favor the option of restructuring the Netherlands Antilles.
 Born:
 Justin Anderson, American professional basketball player; in Montross, Virginia
 Marco Chiosa, Italian footballer; in Cirié, Italy
 Spyros Fourlanos, Greek footballer; in Athens, Greece
 Kerim Frei, Austrian footballer; in Feldkirch, Vorarlberg, Austria
 Joey Gallo (born Joseph Nicholas Gallo), American Major League Baseball left fielder; in Henderson, Nevada
 Lloyd Glasspool, British tennis player; in Redditch, England
 Amal Knight, Jamaican footballer; in Kingston, Jamaica
 Alexei Koșelev, Moldovan footballer; in Chișinău, Moldova
 Cleo Massey, Australian actress; in Launceston, Tasmania, Australia
 Ooi Tze Liang, Malaysian Olympic diver; in George Town, Penang, Malaysia
 Justin Simmons, National Football League free safety; in Manassas, Virginia
 Suso, Spanish footballer; in Algeciras, Province of Cádiz, Spain
 Cordrea Tankersley, National Football League cornerback; in Beech Island, South Carolina
 Kelly Zeeman, Dutch footballer; in Amsterdam, Netherlands
 Died: Leonid Gaidai, 70, Soviet comedy director

Saturday, November 20, 1993
 Comoros joins the Arab League.

 Avioimpex Flight 110, a Yakovlev Yak-42D, crashes into Mount Trojani near Ohrid, Macedonia, killing all 8 crew members and 115 of the 116 passengers.
 At the 29th Vanier Cup, the 1993 CIAU football championship game, held at the SkyDome in Toronto, the Toronto Varsity Blues defeat the Calgary Dinosaurs by a score of 37–34.
 Born:
 Man Asaad, Syrian Olympic weightlifter; in Hama, Syria
 Viviane Asseyi, French footballer; in Mont-Saint-Aignan, Seine-Maritime, France
 Scott Barrett, New Zealand rugby union player; in New Plymouth, New Zealand
 Arinze Stanley Egbengwu, Nigerian hyperrealist artist and activist; in Lagos, Nigeria
 Ella Van Kerkhoven, Belgian footballer; in Leuven, Belgium
 Junior Paulo, New Zealand rugby league player; in Auckland, Auckland Region, New Zealand
 Sanjin Prcić, Bosnian footballer; in Belfort, France
 Anna Prugova, Russian Olympic ice hockey player; in Khabarovsk, Khabarovsk Krai, Russia
 Sumire Satō, Japanese idol and actress
 Miloš Stanojević, Serbian footballer; in Valjevo, Republic of Serbia, Federal Republic of Yugoslavia
 Died: Emile Ardolino, 50, American film director, complications from AIDS

Sunday, November 21, 1993
 A tiger shark attacks and kills pearl diver Richard Bisley off Roebuck Bay, Broome, Western Australia.
Peters survives with a broken ankle.
 Born:
 Georgi Dzhikiya, Russian footballer; in Moscow, Russia
 Mikhail Markin, Russian footballer; in Kovylkino, Russia
 Elena Myers, American motorcycle racer; in Mountain View, California
 Cooper Rush, National Football League quarterback; in Charlotte, Michigan
 Bojan Sanković, Montenegrin footballer; in Knin, Croatia
 Patrik Šorm, Czech Olympic sprinter; in Prague, Czech Republic
 Died: Bill Bixby, 59, American actor, cancer

Monday, November 22, 1993
 Jörg Müller wins the 1993 Macau Grand Prix on the Guia Circuit in Macau.
 Americans commemorate the 30th anniversary of the assassination of John F. Kennedy, the 35th President of the United States.
 Born:
 Saturnin Allagbé (born Owolabi Franck Saturnin Allagbé Kassifa), Beninese footballer; in Assaba Region, Mauritania
 Thomas Dreßen, German Olympic alpine skier; in Garmisch-Partenkirchen, Bavaria, Germany
 Adèle Exarchopoulos, French actress; in Paris, France
 Gettomasa (born Aleksi Lehikoinen), Finnish rapper; in Montreal, Quebec, Canada
 Isabella Isaksen, American Olympic modern pentathlete; in Fayetteville, Arkansas
 Mattias Rönngren, Swedish Olympic alpine skier; in Åre, Sweden
 Marc Soler, Spanish cyclist; in Vilanova i la Geltrú, Spain
 Dennis Szczęsny, Polish-German handball player; in Dinslaken, North Rhine-Westphalia, Germany
 Lauren Wade, Northern Irish footballer; in Coleraine, Northern Ireland (some sources give birthdate as November 21, 1993)
 Zuchu (born Zuhura Othman Soud), Tanzanian singer and songwriter
 Died:
 Anthony Burgess, 76, English author, lung cancer
 Joseph Yodoyman, 42–43, Chadian politician, 4th Prime Minister of Chad

Tuesday, November 23, 1993
 Death Row Records and Interscope Records release Doggystyle, the debut studio album by American rapper Snoop Doggy Dogg.
 Born:
 Haji Ahmadov, Azerbaijani footballer; in Zaqatala, Azerbaijan
 Cheikhou Dieng, Senegalese footballer
 Kevin Londoño, Colombian footballer; in Bello, Antioquia, Colombia
 Jean-Baptiste Maille, French professional basketball player; in Le Mans, France
 Jamiro Monteiro, Cabo Verdean footballer; in Rotterdam, Netherlands (some sources give birthdate as November 28, 1993)
 Faye Njie, Finnish-born Gambian Olympic judoka; in Helsinki, Finland
 Tim Patrick, National Football League wide receiver; in San Diego, California
 Julia Sebastián, Argentinean Olympic breaststroke swimmer; in Santa Fe, Argentina
 Christian Tabó, Uruguayan footballer; in Montevideo, Uruguay

Wednesday, November 24, 1993
 A jury finds 11-year-olds Robert Thompson and Jon Venables guilty of the murder of James Bulger, making them the youngest convicted murderers of the 20th century in the United Kingdom.
 33-year-old operating engineer Anthony Oddo is killed while working on a water tunnel in Maspeth, Queens, New York City. He is the twentieth man to die working on the same project, which began in 1970. Seven other workers are injured.
 Born:
 Bryan Acosta, Honduran footballer; in La Ceiba, Honduras
 Ivi Adamou, Greek Cypriot singer; in Ayia Napa, Cyprus
 Tayler Adams, New Zealand rugby union player; in Auckland, New Zealand
 Donervon Daniels, Montserratian footballer; in Plymouth, Montserrat
 Jasper De Buyst, Belgian professional and Olympic cyclist; in Asse, Belgium
 Hande Erçel, Turkish actress and model; in Bandırma, Balıkesir Province, Turkey
 Saoirse-Monica Jackson, Irish actress; in Derry, Northern Ireland
 Savanah Leaf, British Olympic volleyball player, film director and photographer; in London, Greater London, England
 Zoe Levin, American actress; in Chicago, Illinois
 Chelsea Lewis, Welsh netball player; in Merthyr Tydfil, Wales
 Rauno Nurger, Estonian basketball player; in Keila, Estonia
 Joe Pigott, English footballer; in Maidstone, Kent, England
 Fridolina Rolfö, Swedish footballer; in Kungsbacka, Sweden
 Madison de Rozario, Australian Paralympic champion athlete and wheelchair racer; in Perth, Western Australia
 Olena Shkhumova, Ukrainian Olympic luger; in Lviv, Lviv Oblast, Ukraine
 Brandon Starc, Australian Olympic high jumper; in Baulkham Hills, New South Wales, Australia
 David Walker, American professional basketball player; in Stow, Ohio
 Died:
 Bernard V. Bothmer, 81, American Egyptologist
 Albert Collins (born Albert Gene Drewery), 61, American blues guitarist and singer, lung cancer

Thursday, November 25, 1993
 Yemeni kidnappers abduct American diplomat Haynes Mahoney; they will free him on December 1.
 Born:
 Salum Ageze Kashafali, Norwegian Paralympic champion sprinter; in Goma, Zaire
 Danny Kent, English motorcycle racer; in Chippenham, Wiltshire, England
 David Kiki, Beninese footballer; in Vakon, Akpro-Missérété, Benin
 Yuki Kobori, Japanese Olympic swimmer; in Ishikawa, Fukushima, Japan
 İsmail Ege Şaşmaz, Turkish actor; in Manisa, Turkey
 Emily Sonnett, American Olympic and professional soccer player; in Marietta, Georgia

Friday, November 26, 1993

 In Auckland, New Zealand, a mid-air collision between an Aérospatiale TwinStar police helicopter and a Piper Archer airplane kills four people.
 The BBC air the first part of Dimensions in Time, the 30th-anniversary Doctor Who special, as part of the Children in Need telethon. The second part will air the following night as part of Noel's House Party.
 The crash of a Marchetti M260 single-engine aircraft in Santa Monica, California, kills student pilots Steven Pollack, the 34-year-old son of film director Sydney Pollack, and 35-year-old David Lyon, and seriously injures their flight instructor.
 Born:
 Terry Antonis, Australian footballer; in Bankstown, Sydney, Australia
 Gian Clavell, Puerto Rican professional basketball player; in Caguas, Puerto Rico
 Georgia Guy, New Zealand cricketer; in Auckland, New Zealand
 Eron Harris, American professional basketball player; in Indianapolis, Indiana
 Rhodri Hughes, Welsh rugby union player; in Swansea, Wales
 Brandie Jay, American artistic gymnast; in Fort Collins, Colorado
 Marin Jurina, Bosnian footballer; in Livno, Bosnia and Herzegovina
 Kim Min-tae, South Korean professional and Olympic footballer; in Incheon, South Korea
 Kuo Hsing-chun, Taiwanese Olympic champion weightlifter; in Yilan City, Taiwan
 Jordan Loveridge, American professional basketball player; in West Jordan, Utah
 Kelsey Mitchell, Canadian professional and Olympic champion track cyclist; in Brandon, Manitoba, Canada
 Erena Ono, Japanese singer (AKB48); in Tokyo, Japan
 Elizabeth Pelton, American swimmer; in Fairfield, Connecticut
 Eliana Stábile, Argentine footballer; in Buenos Aires, Argentina

Saturday, November 27, 1993
 Born:
 Sion Bennett, New Zealand-born Welsh rugby union player
 Qëndrim Guri, Kosovan Olympic cyclist; in Ferizaj, Federal Republic of Yugoslavia
 Toa Halafihi, New Zealand-born Italian rugby union player; in Gisborne, New Zealand
 Omar Jimenez, American college basketball player, journalist and correspondent; in Worcester, Massachusetts
 Maor Kandil, Israeli footballer; in Tel Aviv, Israel
 Joan Kipkemoi, Kenyan long-distance runner; in Kericho, Kenya
 Ivan Marinković, Serbian professional basketball player; in Belgrade, Republic of Serbia, Federal Republic of Yugoslavia
 Gonzalo Najar, Argentine cyclist
 Arne Naudts, Belgian footballer; in Ghent, Belgium
 Antonio Panfili, Italian figure skater; in Venice, Italy
 Aubrey Peeples, American actress and singer; in Lake Mary, Florida
 Feras Shelbaieh, Jordanian footballer; in Amman, Jordan
 Tutizama Tanito, Solomon Islands footballer
 Um Vichet, Cambodian footballer; in Phnom Penh, Cambodia
 Benjamin Verbič, Slovenian footballer; in Celje, Slovenia

Sunday, November 28, 1993
 The Observer reveals that a channel of communications has existed between the Provisional Irish Republican Army and the British government, despite the government's persistent denials.
 At the 81st Grey Cup, the 1993 Canadian Football League championship game, held at McMahon Stadium in Calgary, Alberta, the West Division champion Edmonton Eskimos defeat the East Division champion Winnipeg Blue Bombers by a score of 33–23.
 Born:
 Lukhanyo Am, South African rugby union player; in King William's Town, South Africa
 Samuel Dupratt, American alpine skier
 Gabriel Graciani, Argentine footballer; in Bovril, Argentina
 Bryshere Y. Gray, American actor and rapper; in Philadelphia, Pennsylvania
 David Nofoaluma, Australian-Samoan rugby league player; in Newcastle, New South Wales, Australia
 Stephanie Park, Canadian paralympic wheelchair basketball player; in Vancouver, British Columbia
 Died: Kenneth Connor, 75, English comedian, cancer

Monday, November 29, 1993

 A total lunar eclipse takes place.
 1993 Jolimont Centre siege: In Canberra, Australia, 47-year-old Felipe Ruizdiaz shoots and wounds swimming pool manager Geoff McGibbon. He then drives his utility vehicle, rigged with petrol and gas canisters, through the front glass wall of the Jolimont Centre, his estranged wife's workplace. After a two-hour siege during which Ruizdiaz throws Molotov cocktails and fires his shotgun at police and rescue workers, he sets fire to the building and kills himself.
 Born:
 Stefon Diggs, National Football League wide receiver; in Gaithersburg, Maryland
 Ernia (born Matteo Professione), Italian rapper (Troupe D'Elite); in Milan, Italy
 Mina El Hammani, Spanish actress; in Madrid, Spain
 Jacqueline Janzen, German Olympic ice hockey player; in Villingen-Schwenningen, Baden-Württemberg, Germany
 Cyrus Jones, National Football League cornerback and return specialist; in Baltimore, Maryland
 Manuel Lazzari, Italian footballer; in Valdagno, Italy
 Marcus Martin, National Football League guard; in Los Angeles, California
 Zoran Marušić, Serbian footballer; in Kraljevo, Republic of Serbia, Federal Republic of Yugoslavia
 Okomayin Segun Onimisi, Nigerian footballer; in Enugu, Nigeria
 Giulian Pedone, Swiss motorcycle racer (some sources give birthdate as November 30, 1993); in Neuchâtel, Switzerland
 Rene Renner, Austrian footballer; in Wels, Austria
 Yuki Takahashi, Japanese Olympic freestyle wrestler; in Kuwana, Mie, Japan
 Died:
 Sir Jack Longland, 88, English broadcaster, educator and mountain climber
 J. R. D. Tata, 89, Indian aviator and businessman, kidney infection

Tuesday, November 30, 1993
 In Kampala, Uganda, East African heads of state sign an agreement establishing the Permanent Tripartite Commission for East African Co-operation.
The Troubles: 47-year-old Catholic civilian John Hagan is shot and killed by the Ulster Freedom Fighters as he leaves his workplace in Dundonald, County Down.

 U.S. President Bill Clinton signs the Brady Handgun Violence Prevention Act and legislation permitting women to serve aboard combat vessels in the United States Navy.
 The historical drama film Schindler's List, produced and directed by Steven Spielberg, receives its world premiere in Washington, D.C. It will receive the Best Picture and Best Director prizes at the 66th Academy Awards in March 1994.
 Born:
 Tom Blomqvist, British-born Swedish-New Zealand racing driver; in Cambridge, England
 Stevie Browning, American professional basketball player
 Yuri Chinen, Japanese idol
 Mia Goth, English actress and model
 Kehri Jones, American bobsledder; in Fort Hood, Texas
 Tim Leibold, German footballer; in Böblingen, Baden-Württemberg, Germany
 Lost Frequencies (born Felix De Laet), Belgian DJ and record producer; in the City of Brussels, Belgium
 Julián Navas, Argentine footballer; in Mendoza, Argentina
 Seidu Salifu, Ghanaian footballer; in Tamale, Ghana
 Kevon Seymour, National Football League cornerback; in Pasadena, California
 Charlie Stemp, English actor; in Peckham, London, England

References

1993
November 1993 events
1993-11
1993-11